Maclovia (Belleza Maldita in some countries) is a 1948 Mexican romantic drama film directed by Emilio Fernández and starring María Félix and Pedro Armendáriz.

Plot summary
On the beautiful Janitzio Island, in the middle of the Pátzcuaro Lake in Michoacán in Mexico lives Maclovia (María Félix), the beautiful daughter of a leader of Purépecha Indian community (Miguel Inclán). Maclovia loves José María Lopez (Pedro Armendáriz), a young very poor Indian. Maclovia's father refuses to the marriage of the couple. José María hopes to win the favor of the old man. But the arrival of a battalion causing the conflict when the brutal sergeant (Carlos López Moctezuma) develops eyes for Maclovia.

Notes and references
The movie was acclaimed during the 1949 edition of the Venice Film Festival. The face of María Félix characterized as Maclovia, hung from the bridges of San Marcos.

External links 

1948 films
Mexican black-and-white films
Films directed by Emilio Fernández
1948 romantic drama films
María Félix
1940s Spanish-language films
Indigenous cinema in Latin America
Mexican romantic drama films
1940s Mexican films